This list of museums in Nebraska encompasses museums which are defined for this context as institutions (including nonprofit organizations, government entities, and private businesses) that collect and care for objects of cultural, artistic, scientific, or historical interest and make their collections or related exhibits available for public viewing. Museums that exist only in cyberspace (i.e., virtual museums) are not included.

Museums

Defunct museums
 Frank H. Woods Telephone Museum, Lincoln, permanently closed in July 2018.
 Lentz Center for Asian Culture, Lincoln, part of the University of Nebraska–Lincoln, closed to public visits
 National Korean War Museum, Oxford, opened and closed in 2005 due to fraud
 VietNam War National Museum, Nelson, photos, closed due to fraud
 Wildlife World, Gering, also known as WyoBraska Natural History Museum, collections moving to Riverside Discovery Center in Scottsbluff

See also
 Nature Centers in Nebraska

Resources

Central Nebraska Adventures

References

Museums
Nebraska
Museums